DUF may refer to:
 Duf, Mavrovo and Rostuša, North Macedonia
 Domain of unknown function, a protein domain
 Drug Use Forecasting, a program of the United States Department of Justice

See also
 Duff (disambiguation)